Subbaraya Sastri (1803–1862) the son and student of Syama Sastri, one of the most famous figures in the history of Carnatic music. He also has the unique distinction of having studied music from all the three of the musicians now acknowledged as "the Trinity of Carnatic Music": his father, and the master musicians Tyagaraja and Muthuswamy Dikshitar.

Early life
Subbaraya was born in 1803 as the second son of Syama Sastri. He studied music initially from his father. Later Syama Shastri asked Tyagaraja to teach his son and sent Subbaraya to him. He also had the opportunity to learn a few krithi from Muthuswami Dikshitar. He also learnt Hindustani music from Meru Goswami, a musician of the Thanjavur palace, and from Ramadas Swami who was a recluse and who lived in Tiruvidaimarudur near Kumbakonam.

Career
Subbaraya Shastry composed only a few krithi. Sastri composed most of his kritis in praise of the Mother Goddess. Some of his kritis are Janani ninnuvina (Reetigowla), Ninnusevinchina (Yadukulakambhoji), Venkatasailavihara (Hamirkalyani) and Sankari Nee (Begada)

Compositions

See also
List of Carnatic composers

References

Carnatic composers
1862 deaths
1803 births
19th-century composers
People from British India